Yenagi ("ಏಣಗಿ"), is a  village, named after renowned theatre personality Sri Yenagi Balappa (ಏಣಗಿ ಬಾಳಪ್ಪ), situated in Saundatti Taluk of Belagavi district in the southern state of Karnataka, India.

References

Villages in Belagavi district